The Supervisor's House No. 1001, located in Malheur National Forest in John Day, Oregon, was designed by architects of the United States Forest Service and was built by Civilian Conservation Corps labor in 1938.  It was listed on the National Register of Historic Places in 1986.  The listing included two contributing buildings, which are a  -story house and a detached one-car garage.  Neither house nor garage has any significant decoration; both have shake exterior walls.

The property was deemed significant as a typical example of a Civilian Conservation Corps construction project that provided employment in emergency work-relief;  it also "represents the Forest Service's presence in the locality, as part of the headquarters for field operation, and denotes, via the physical facilities required to carry out the agency's expanding responsibilities, the critical transition in the Service's development from custodial superintendence to extensive resource management."  Further it was an example of Rustic architecture style developed by the Region 6 architects of the Forest Service.

References

Houses on the National Register of Historic Places in Oregon
Houses completed in 1938
Grant County, Oregon
National Register of Historic Places in Grant County, Oregon